Frye Gaillard (born December 23, 1946) is an American historian and author.

Early life and education
Frye Gaillard was born in Mobile, Alabama on December 23, 1946. His parents were lawyer and later judge Walter Frye Gaillard, Sr., and Helen Amante Gaillard. Gaillard attended Vanderbilt University, graduating in 1968. During the 1960s Gaillard came into proximity with many of the most prominent political personalities of the decade. As a high school student in 1963, Gaillard witnessed the arrest of Martin Luther King Jr. in Birmingham, Alabama, during King's Birmingham campaign against racial segregation. While at Vanderbilt he came into contact with Stokley Carmichael and Eldridge Cleaver, when the two Black Panthers were engaged to speak. Shortly after, in 1968, he invited Robert F. Kennedy to speak at Vanderbilt, 11 weeks prior to Kennedy's assassination.

Career
Gaillard started his career at the Race Relations Reporter in Nashville as managing editor from 1970 to 1972, then moved to the Charlotte Observer as a writer, editor and columnist, while teaching nonfiction writing at Queens College, both until 1990. While with the Observer he won awards from the North Carolina Press Association for spot news, features and investigative reporting.  In 2004 he moved back to Mobile. As an author he won the 1989 Gustavus Myers Award for The Dream Long Deferred, and in 2007 the Alabama Library Association Book of the Year for Cradle of Freedom.

Gaillard's 2018 book A Hard Rain was inspired by David Halberstam's The Fifties, and documents the 1960s in part through Gaillard's experiences of the time. Gailllard has been author-in-residence at the University of South Alabama since 2007. He has written more than 25 books.

Published works
 Race, Rock and Religion: Profiles from a Southern Journalist, 1982
 The Catawba River, with Dot Jackson, 1983
 Becoming Truly Free: 300 Years of Black History in the Carolinas, with Richard Maschal and others, 1985
 The Unfinished Presidency: Essays on Jimmy Carter, 1986
 The Dream Long Deferred: The Landmark Struggle for Desegregation in Charlotte, North Carolina, 1988
 Watermelon Wine: The Spirit of Country Music, 1989
 The Secret Diary of Mikhail Gorbachev, 1990
 Southern Voices: Profiles and Other Stories, 1991
 Kyle at 200 M.P.H.: A Sizzling Season in the Petty/NASCAR Dynasty, with Kyle Petty, 1993
 Lessons from the Big House: One Family's Passage through the History of the South, with Nancy Gaillard, 1994
 The Way We See It: Documentary Photography by the Children of Charlotte, with Rachel Gaillard, 1995
 The 521 All-Stars, with Bryon Baldwin, 1999
 If I Were A Carpenter: Twenty Years of Habitat for Humanity, 1996
 The Heart of Dixie: Southern Rebels, Renegades and Heroes, 1996
 Carmel Country Club: The First 50 Years, 1997
 Voices from the Attic, 1997
 As Long as the Waters Flow: Native Americans in the South and East, with Carolyn Demerit and others, 1998
 Mobile and the Eastern Shore, with Nancy Gaillard, 2003
 Charlotte's Holy Wars: Religion in a New South City, 2005
 Cradle of Freedom: Alabama and the Movement that Changed America, 2006
 Prophet from Plains: Jimmy Carter and His Legacy, 2007
 In the Path of Storms: Bayou la Batre, Coden and the Alabama Coast, with Sheila Hagler and others, 2008
 With Music and Justice for All" Some Southerners and Their Passions, 2008
 Alabama's Civil Rights Trail: An Illustrated Guide to the Cradle of Freedom, 2010
 The Books that Mattered: A Reader's Memoir, 2012
 The Quilt: And the Poetry of Alabama Music, with Kathryn Scheldt, 2015
 Journey to the Wilderness: War, Memory, and a Southern Family's Civil War Letters, with Steven Trout, 2015
 Go South to Freedom, with Anne Kent Rush, 2016
 A Hard Rain: America in the 1960s, Our Decade of Hope, Possibility, and Innocence Lost, 2018
 The Slave Who Went to Congress'', with Marti Rosner and others, 2020

References

1946 births
American political writers
American male non-fiction writers
Writers from Alabama
20th-century American historians
21st-century American non-fiction writers
21st-century American historians
20th-century American non-fiction writers
20th-century American newspaper editors
Vanderbilt University alumni
Living people
20th-century American male writers
21st-century American male writers